Pedro Martínez Portero (born 26 April 1997) is a Spanish professional tennis player. During his junior career, he won the junior Davis Cup 2013.
Martínez has a career high ATP singles ranking of World No. 40 achieved on 9 May 2022. He also has a career high ATP doubles ranking of World No. 53 achieved on 9 May 2022.

Professional career

2018: ATP debut
Martínez made his ATP main draw debut at the 2018 Grand Prix Hassan II after qualifying for the singles main draw.

2019-2020: Major singles & doubles debut, top 100 singles debut
Martínez made his Grand Slam debut in the main draw at the 2019 French Open in singles and at the 2020 French Open in doubles with Christian Garin.

He reached his first ATP quarterfinal in his career at the ATP 500 2020 Rio Open in Brazil defeating Hugo Dellien and Pablo Andujar.

In June, he made the third round of the 2020 French Open in singles, his best Grand Slam result thus far. As a result he entered the top 100 in singles at World No. 97 on 12 October 2020.

2021: French Open doubles semifinal & top 100, first ATP final, top 60 in singles

Martínez reached the third round of the 2021 Australian Open in singles for the first time at this Major, defeating Emil Ruusuvuori, his second showing at this level in his career.

At the 2021 French Open he reached the semifinals as alternate in doubles with fellow Spaniard Pablo Andujar, with whom he also made his Grand Slam doubles debut as a pair at the 2021 Australian Open. They defeated the 14th seeded Belgians Sander Gillé/Joran Vliegen in the third round and the pair of Rohan Bopanna/Franko Skugor in the quarterfinals. They entered the tournament as a replacement alternate pair for the top seeds Nikola Mektić/Mate Pavić. As a result Martínez made his top 100 debut in doubles at world No. 95 for the first time in his career on 14 June 2021.

On his debut, Martínez reached the third round of the 2021 Wimbledon Championships in singles for the first time in his career, defeating 13th seed Gael Monfils, his third showing in the third round of a Grand Slam.

Martínez reached his first ATP final at the 2021 Generali Open Kitzbühel where he was defeated by Casper Ruud. He secured the biggest win of his career when he overcame world No. 16 Roberto Bautista Agut en route to the championship match. He also reached the semifinals at the same tournament partnering Marc Polmans. As a result he reached a new career-high singles ranking of world No. 76 and a doubles ranking of No. 88 on 2 August 2021. At the 2021 US Open he recorded his first win at this Major over James Duckworth to reach the second round. After winning the Challenger in Seville, he reached a career high ranking of world No. 59 on 13 September 2021.

At the 2021 Kremlin Cup he was defeated by Marin Cilic in only the second quarterfinal of the season and third in his career at ATP level. He reached a career-high singles ranking of No. 58 on 25 October 2021. At the same tournament, he also reached the semifinals partnering Ilya Ivashka. As a result he returned to a doubles ranking of No. 87 on 25 October 2021 tied with his best ranking thus far.

2022: ATP Cup finalist, first ATP singles & doubles titles, Top 40
Martínez participated for the first time in the 2022 ATP Cup as part of the Spanish team where he played doubles with Alejandro Davidovich Fokina (won both matches) and Albert Ramos Vinolas (lost both matches) and helped Spain reach the final.

Martínez reached the third round of the 2022 Australian Open in doubles for the first time at this Major partnering compatriot Pablo Andujar. As a result he reached a new career-high doubles ranking of World No. 72 on 31 January 2022.

Martinez was seeded fourth in Santiago. After receiving a first round bye, he defeated Jaume Munar, Yannick Hanfmann and Alejandro Tabilo to reach his second ATP final. He beat Sebastián Báez in the final to win his first ATP title. As a result he made his top 50 debut on 28 February 2022.

He reached the third round of a Masters 1000 for the first time in his career at the 2022 Miami Open. He made his top 40 debut following the 2022 Mutua Madrid Open on 9 May 2022.

At the 2022 Rakuten Japan Open Tennis Championships he reached the quarterfinals for a second time at an ATP 500 tour-level, defeating Alexei Popyrin and Jaume Munar.

Performance timelines

Singles 
Current through the 2023 Australian Open.

Doubles

ATP career finals

Singles: 2 (1 title, 1 runner-up)

Doubles: 1 (1 title)

Challenger and Futures Finals

Singles: 20 (11 titles, 9 runner–ups)

Doubles: 37 (21 titles, 16 runner–ups)

Record against top 10 players
Martínez's record against players who have been ranked in the top 10, with those who are active in boldface. Only ATP Tour main draw matches are considered:

References

External links

 
 

1997 births
Living people
Spanish male tennis players
People from Alzira, Valencia
Sportspeople from the Province of Valencia
Tennis players from the Valencian Community
21st-century Spanish people